The Department of Science was an Australian government department that existed between December 1972 and June 1975.

Scope
Information about the department's functions and/or government funding allocation could be found in the Administrative Arrangements Orders, the annual Portfolio Budget Statements and in the Department's annual reports.

According to the Administrative Arrangements Order issued 19 December 1972, at its creation, the Department was responsible for:
Science and technology, including research and support of research
Meteorology
Ionospheric Prediction Service
Patents of Inventions and designs, and trade marks
Weights and Measures

Structure
The Department was an Australian Public Service department, staffed by officials who were responsible to the Minister for Science.

The Secretary of the Department was Hugh Ennor.

References

Science
Australia, Science
Australia